Kadalamma is a 1963 Indian Malayalam-language film directed and produced by Kunchacko and written by Ponkunnam Varkey. The film stars Sathyan, Rajasri, B. S. Saroja and Maya in the lead roles. The film had musical score by G. Devarajan.

Cast
 
Sathyan as Neelan
Rajasree as Renuka & Radha 
B. S. Saroja as Chirutha
Maya as Karthi
Sankaradi as Kochuvelu
Kottayam Chellappan
Nellikkodu Bhaskaran as Udumbankunju
S. P. Pillai as Ramabhadran
K. S. Gopinath
Bahadoor as Shikar
Mavelikkara Ponnamma as Chithrangatha
Kottarakkara Sreedharan Nair as Jayarajan
Adoor Pankajam as Kaliyamma
M. S. Thripunithura 
Master Boban as Young Neelan
Baby Vilasini as Young Renuka
Baby Vinodini  as young Karthi
Manavalan Joseph as Dumdum

Soundtrack
The music was composed by G. Devarajan and the lyrics were written by Vayalar Ramavarma.

References

External links
 

1963 films
1960s Malayalam-language films